The Women's recurve 30m event at the 2010 South American Games was held on March 21 at 11:15.

Medalists

Results

References
Report

30m Recurve Women